The United States competed as host country at the 2022 World Games held in Birmingham, United States from 7 to 17 July 2022. Athletes representing the United States won 16 gold medals, 18 silver medals and 10 bronze medals. The country finished in 2nd place in the medal table.

Medalists

The following U.S. competitors won medals at the games. In the by discipline sections below, medalists' names are bolded.

|  style="text-align:left; width:56%; vertical-align:top;"|

Invitational sports 

|  style="text-align:left; width:22%; vertical-align:top;"|

Competitors
The following is the list of number of competitors in the Games.

Air sports

United States competed in air sports.

Drone racing

Parachuting

Archery

United States competed in archery. American archers competed in each of the archery events.

Barebow/recurve

Compound

Beach handball

United States competed in beach handball.

Boules sports

United States competed in boules sports.

Bowling

United States competed in bowling.

Canoe marathon

United States competed in canoe marathon.

Canoe polo

United States competed in canoe polo.

Cue sports

United States competed in cue sports.

Men

Women

Dancesport

United States competed in dancesport.

Breakdancing
{|class=wikitable style=font-size:95%;text-align:center
|-
!rowspan=2|Athlete
!rowspan=2|Event
!colspan=4|Group stage
!Quarterfinal
!Semifinal
!colspan=2|Final / 
|-style=font-size:95%
!OppositionResult
!OppositionResult
!OppositionResult
!Rank
!OppositionResult
!OppositionResult
!OppositionResult
!Rank
|-
|align=left|Morris Isby
|align=left rowspan=3|B-Boys
|W 2–0
|L 0–2
|L 0–2
|2 Q
|L 0–2
|colspan=2|did not advance
|8
|-
|align=left|Jeffrey Louis
|L 0–2
|W 2–0
|W 2–0
|2 Q
|W 2–1
|W 4–0
|L 1–3
|
|-
|align=left|Victor Montalvo
|W 2–0
|W 2–0
|2–0
|1 Q|W 2–0
|W 3–1
|W 3–1
|
|-
|align=left|Vicki Chang
|align=left rowspan=2|B-Girls
|L 0–2
|L 0–2
|L 0–2
|4
|colspan=3|did not advance
|16
|-
|align=left|Sunny Choi|W 2–0
|T 1–1
|W 2–0
|1 Q|W 2–0
|W 3–2
|L 0–4
|
|}LatinStandardDuathlon

United States competed in duathlon.

Finswimming

United States competed in finswimming.

Fistball

United States competed in fistball.

Flag football

United States won two medals in flag football.

Floorball

United States competed in the floorball tournament.

Summary

Group play

Seventh place game

Flying disc

United States won the gold medal in the flying disc competition.

Gymnastics

Acrobatic

United States won two medals in acrobatic gymnastics.

Rhythmic

United States competed in rhythmic gymnastics.

Trampoline

United States won two medals in trampoline gymnastics.

Inline hockey

United States competed in the inline hockey tournament.

Ju-jitsu

United States competed in ju-jitsu.

Karate

United States competed in karate.MenWomenKickboxing

United States competed in kickboxing.

Lacrosse

United States won the silver medal in both the men's and women's lacrosse tournaments.SummaryMuaythai

United States competed in muaythai.MenWomenOrienteering

United States competed in orienteering.

Parkour

United States competed in parkour.

Powerlifting

United States competed in powerlifting.

Racquetball

United States competed in racquetball.

Roller skating

Artistic

United States competed in artistic roller skating.

Road

United States competed in road speed skating.

Track

United States competed in track speed skating.MenWomenSoftball

United States won the softball tournament.SummarySport climbing

United States competed in sport climbing.BoulderLeadSpeedSquash

United States competed in squash.

Sumo

United States competed in sumo.MenWomenWater skiing

United States competed in water skiing.MenWomenWheelchair rugby

United States competed in wheelchair rugby.Summary'''

Wushu

United States competed in wushu.

References

Nations at the 2022 World Games
2022
World Games